Talcher Thermal Power Station Township is a census town in Anugul district in the Indian state of Odisha. Talcher Thermal Power Station is one of the thermal power stations of NTPC Ltd.

Demographics
 India census, Talcher Thermal Power Station Township had a population of 6616. Males constitute 55% of the population and females 45%. Talcher Thermal Power Station Township has an average literacy rate of 85%, higher than the national average of 59.5%: male literacy is 89%, and female literacy is 80%. In Talcher Thermal Power Station Township, 8% of the population is under 6 years of age.

There is one sports stadium, Market complex and Talcher Thermal Railway Halt.

See also
 Talcher

References

Cities and towns in Angul district
Townships in India